USS E. Benson Dennis (SP-791) was a United States Navy patrol vessel in commission from 1917 to 1919.

E. Benson Dennis was built as a commercial "Menhaden Fisherman"-type fishing trawler of the same name in 1901 by C. W. Crockett at Pocomoke City, Maryland. On 14 May 1917, the U.S. Navy acquired her from her owner, E. Benson Dennis of Cape Charles, Virginia, for use as a section patrol boat during World War I. She was commissioned on 15 May 1917 as USS E. Benson Dennis (SP-791).

Assigned to the 5th Naval District, E. Benson Dennis performed submarine net patrols and guard ship duties for the rest of World War I.

E. Benson Dennis was decommissioned on 12 March 1919 and returned to Dennis the same day.

References

Department of the Navy Naval History and Heritage Command Online Library of Selected Images: U.S. Navy Ships: USS E. Benson Dennis (SP-791), 1917–1919
NavSource Online: Section Patrol Craft Photo Archive E. Benson Dennis (SP 791)

Patrol vessels of the United States Navy
World War I patrol vessels of the United States
Ships built in Pocomoke City, Maryland
1901 ships